Cyril Patrick Mahon (9 September 1882 – 14 July 1945) was a British banker who served as Chief Cashier of the Bank of England from 1925 to 1929 and comptroller of the Bank from 1929 to 1932. Mahon was succeeded as Chief Cashier by Basil G. Catterns.

Mahon was born in Leigh-on-Mendip, Somerset, the son of village vicar Rev. George Augustus Mahon. He was educated at All Saints School, Clifton, and at All Saints School, Bloxham, Oxfordshire.

He worked for a year at Lincoln Bank in Grimsby before joining the Bank of England in March 1901. In 1916, he was appointed assistant principal of the Discount Office before being promoted to assistant chief cashier in 1918, deputy chief cashier in 1923 and chief cashier in 1926. He was appointed to his final position, comptroller, in 1929, which was then the senior official position in the Bank. In 1932, health problems forced him into early retirement at age 49.

Following his death in Taunton, Somerset in 1945, The Times recalled him as "a man of outstanding character, and his technical ability and clarity of judgment were of great service to the Bank during the troublous years after the 1914–18 war."

References

Chief Cashiers of the Bank of England
1882 births
1945 deaths
People from Somerset
20th-century English businesspeople